St. John Paul II Catholic High School is a coed grades 9-12 college preparatory school, located in Huntsville, Alabama. St. John Paul II Catholic High School is the only Catholic parochial high school in the greater Huntsville area. It was founded in 1996 on 4810 Bradford Drive, previously known as Catholic High School. A new  campus was completed in late 2010 in Thornton Research Park. The new campus includes a chapel, academic wings, auditorium, gymnasium, and athletic fields.

The boys' cross country team took the state championship in 2019, 2020, and 2021. They also placed as runners-up in the state in their respective division in 2015, 2016, 2017, and 2018. The girls cross country team took state runners-up in 2018 and 2019.

St. John Paul II Catholic High School is governed by a Board of Trustees in accordance with policies of the Roman Catholic Diocese of Birmingham in Alabama. The school is accredited by the Southern Association of Colleges and Schools (SACS) and is a member of the National Catholic Educational Association (NCEA).

Notable alumni
 Toyin Ojih Odutola, contemporary visual artist known for her vivid multimedia drawings and works on paper. She has credited Dana Bathurst, an art teacher at Catholic High School, for introducing her to a new understanding of art.

References

External links
 Official website of St. John Paul II Catholic High School

Catholic secondary schools in Alabama
Educational institutions established in 1996
High schools in Huntsville, Alabama
Schools in Madison County, Alabama
1996 establishments in Alabama